Blacks' Magic is the third studio album by American hip hop group Salt-N-Pepa, released on March 19, 1990, by Next Plateau Records and London Records. A critical and commercial success, the album peaked at number 38 on the US Billboard 200 and number 15 on the Top R&B/Hip-Hop Albums chart, and has been certified Platinum by the Recording Industry Association of America (RIAA), denoting shipments in excess of one million copies in the United States. The album spawned four commercially successful singles, three of which reached the top 10 of the Hot Rap Singles chart; "Let's Talk About Sex" (number 13 in the US, number two in the UK), "Expression" (number 26 in the US, number 23 in the UK), "Do You Want Me" (number 21 in the US, number five in the UK), and "You Showed Me" (number 47 in the US, number 15 in the UK).

Track listing

Personnel
Credits adapted from the liner notes of Blacks' Magic.

Salt-N-Pepa
 Salt
 Pepa
 Spinderella

Additional musicians

 Dante Basco - Rapping 
 Jacci McGhee – special guest appearance 
 Joyce Martin – background vocals 
 Alpha – background vocals 
 Omega – background vocals 
 Hurby Luv Bug – background vocals 
 Kid 'n Play – special guest appearance 
 Sybil – special guest appearance 
 Stanley Brown – all keyboards

Technical

 Salt – production 
 Steevee-O, The Boy Wonder – production 
 The Invincibles – production 
 Hurby Luv Bug – production ; album concept
 Excalibur – production 
 Spinderella – production 
 Quicksilver – production 
 Play – album concept
 Andre DeBourg – engineering
 Dana Dum – engineering
 Herb "Pump" Powers – mastering

Artwork
 Charles Lilly – illustration
 Faville Graphics – design

Charts

Weekly charts

Year-end charts

Certifications

References

1990 albums
Albums produced by Hurby Azor
London Records albums
Next Plateau Entertainment albums
Salt-N-Pepa albums